Ellen Remsburg Peck (August 24, 1942 – March 15, 1995) was an American feminist, writer, and childfree activist.

Early life

Born Ellen Remsburg to C. M. and Genevieve Remsburg of Normal, Illinois, Peck attended University High School there and graduated in 1960. A high achiever, she took leading roles in her school's political, acting and debate arenas.

Career
After finishing college, Peck became an eighth-grade English teacher at Pimlico Junior High School in Baltimore, Maryland, where she was briefly known for wearing skirts so short they would not have been allowed on students. In 1969, however, she became rather more widely famous for writing a teenage girl's guide to romance, health, fashion, and beauty called, humorously, How to Get a Teen-Age Boy, and What to Do With Him When You Get Him, a sort of Sex and the Single Girl for teens.  At the time the book was taken seriously, but later Ms. Peck claimed it was written merely as "humor" and it is usually missing from subsequent lists of her books. The book was quite popular, selling more than 50,000 copies in hard-cover, and during the 1970s she wrote an advice column for teen-agers, called "The Column," which appeared in The Baltimore Sun and was nationally syndicated. She subsequently wrote another book providing contraceptive information and called Sex and Birth Control: a Guide for the Young (1973; rev. ed. 1981), with E. James Lieberman, M.D.

In 1971, along with William Granzig she wrote The Baby Trap, one of the first books about the emerging childfree movement.  In 1972, Peck and Shirley Radl founded the National Organization for Non-Parents (N.O.N.), an advocacy organization for men and women who choose not to have children.  She later wrote several more books on parenthood and was, for a time, a rather prominent childfree advocate, even appearing on The Tonight Show where she exchanged views with Joe Namath.

Activism
In 1977, Peck became an associate of the Women's Institute for Freedom of the Press (WIFP). WIFP is an American nonprofit publishing organization. The organization works to increase communication between women and connect the public with forms of women-based media.

Personal life
Ms. Peck was married in 1965 to William Peck, head of an advertising agency in Baltimore. She never had children and eventually divorced. She died of cancer on March 15, 1995, in New York.

Books
 How to Get a Teen-Age Boy, and What to Do With Him When You Get Him,(1969).
 The Baby Trap,(1971), with William Granzig
 Sex and Birth Control: a Guide for the Young (1973; rev. ed. 1981; Spanish tr.), with E. James Lieberman, M.D.
 Pronatalism: The Myth of Mom and Apple Pie(1974), an anthology of writings on pronatalism and its effects on society, co-edited by Judith Senderowitz
 A Funny Thing Happened on the Way to Equality(1975), with William Granzig
 The Joy of the Only Child(1977)
 The Parent Test: How to Measure and Develop Your Talent for Parenthood(1978), with William Granzig.

References

External links
  What's Your Guy-Q by Ellen Peck.
  Cover art for "How to Get a Teen-Age Boy, and What to Do With Him When You Get Him"
 The Baby Trap archived e-book.

1942 births
1995 deaths
American feminist writers
American women's rights activists
Childfree